The El Tari Memorial Cup (formerly named El Tari Cup) is a football competition provincial level organized by Asprov PSSI East Nusa Tenggara and East Nusa Tenggara Provincial Government. This competition is held once a year and every year it is held in different regencies and cities in East Nusa Tenggara.

History
The El Tari Memorial Cup tournament was first initiated by the then Governor of East Nusa Tenggara, namely El Tari in 1969. According to El Tari, the idea of forming this tournament is an effort to unite the people of East Nusa Tenggara.

In the first season of the El Tari Cup in 1969, the representative of East Flores Regency, namely Perseftim managed to come out as champion. The name El Tari Cup then changed its name to El Tari Memorial Cup after 10 years later, precisely in 1979 after Governor El Tari died.

A different story about the start of the El Tari Cup competition was given by the son of a former Perseftim player in the 70s. According to Sandro Monteiro, his father, Cor Monteiro, won the El Tari Cup competition in 1968, when the competition started. Based on the documentation he has, Perseftim has won the El Tari Cup competition three times respectively in 1968, 1974, and 1978 before winning the title again in 2009 which at that time was renamed the El Tari Memorial Cup.

List of Champions

Host & Champions
The following is a list of El Tari Memorial Cup winners from 1968–present;

Number of titles
PSN Ngada is still the holder of the most El Tari Memorial Cup titles with 7 titles. The following is a list of teams with the number of championship titles;

Notes: The text Italic states the validity of the champion is still being debated.

Notes

References

Football competitions in Indonesia
Sport in East Nusa Tenggara
1969 establishments in Indonesia